Plyusnino is a rural locality (a village) in Botanovskoye Rural Settlement, Mezhdurechensky District, Vologda Oblast, Russia. The population was 11 as of 2002.

Geography 
Plyusnino is located 45 km south of Shuyskoye (the district's administrative centre) by road. Yegorye is the nearest rural locality.

References 

Rural localities in Mezhdurechensky District, Vologda Oblast